Pidariguthi  is a village development committee in Parsa District in the Narayani Zone of southern Nepal. At the time of the 1991 Nepal census it had a population of 3294 people living in 538 individual households.

References

Populated places in Parsa District